Organic Geochemistry is a monthly peer-reviewed scientific journal published by Elsevier covering research on all aspects of organic geochemistry. It is an official journal of the European Association of Organic Geochemists. The editors-in-chief are Steven Rowland (University of Plymouth), John Volkman (CSIRO Oceans and Atmosphere), and Cliff Walters (University of Texas at Austin).

Abstracting and indexing
The journal is abstracted and indexed in:

According to the Journal Citation Reports, the journal has a 2021 impact factor of 3.623.

Notable articles
According to the Web of Science, the journal's two most cited papers are:
  (cited 766 times)
  (cited 722 times)

References

External links
 
 European Association of Organic Geochemists

Monthly journals
Publications established in 1977
English-language journals
Geochemistry journals
Elsevier academic journals